Gracilineustes is an extinct genus of marine crocodyliform that lived in the oceans during the Middle to Late Jurassic. Gracilineustes was a carnivore that spent much, if not all, its life out at sea.

Discovery and species
 
Fossil specimens referrable to Gracilineustes are known from Middle-Late Jurassic deposits of England and France.

Valid species
G. leedsi: Western Europe (England) of the Middle Jurassic (Callovian); Metriorhynchus laeve is a junior synonym.
G. acutus: Western Europe (France) of the Late Jurassic (Kimmeridgian)

References

Late Jurassic crocodylomorphs of Europe
Middle Jurassic crocodylomorphs
Prehistoric pseudosuchian genera
Prehistoric marine crocodylomorphs
Fossil taxa described in 2010
Middle Jurassic genus first appearances
Late Jurassic extinctions
Thalattosuchians
Oxford Clay